Sergio Rojas can refer to:

 Sergio Rojas (Argentine footballer)
 Sergio Rojas (Paraguayan footballer)